Japan had an official slave system from the Yamato period (3rd century A.D.) until Toyotomi Hideyoshi abolished it in 1590. Afterwards, the Japanese government facilitated the use of "comfort women" as sex slaves from 1932 – 1945. Prisoners of war captured by Japanese imperial forces were also used as slaves during the Second World War.

Early slavery in Japan
The export of a slave from Japan is recorded in 3rd century Chinese historical record, but it is unclear what system was involved, and whether this was a common practice at that time. These slaves were called seikō ( "living mouth").

In the 8th century, slaves were called Nuhi (奴婢) and laws were issued under the legal codes of the Nara and Heian periods, called Ritsuryousei (律令制). These slaves tended farms and worked around houses. Information on the slave population is questionable, but the proportion of slaves is estimated to have been around 5% of the population.

Slavery persisted into the Sengoku period (1467–1615) even though the attitude that slavery was anachronistic seems to have become widespread among elites.  In 1590, slavery was officially banned under Toyotomi Hideyoshi; but forms of contract and indentured labor persisted alongside the period penal codes' forced labor. Somewhat later, the Edo period penal laws prescribed "non-free labor" for the immediate family of executed criminals in Article 17 of the Gotōke reijō (Tokugawa House Laws), but the practice never became common. The 1711 Gotōke reijō was compiled from over 600 statutes promulgated between 1597 and 1696.

Portuguese enslavement of Japanese people
After the Portuguese first made contact with Japan in 1543, a large-scale slave trade developed in which Portuguese purchased Japanese as slaves in Japan and sold them to various locations overseas, mostly in Portuguese-colonized regions of Asia such as southern China and Goa but including Argentina and Portugal itself, until it was formally outlawed in 1595. Many documents mention the large slave trade along with protests against the enslavement of Japanese. Although the actual number of slaves is debated, the proportions on the number of slaves tends to be exaggerated by some Japanese historians. At least several hundred Japanese people were sold; some of them were prisoners of war sold by their captors, others were sold by their feudal lords, and others were sold by their families to escape poverty. The Japanese slaves are believed to be the first of their nation to end up in Europe, and the Portuguese purchased a number of Japanese slave girls to bring to Portugal for sexual purposes, as noted by the Church in 1555. Sebastian of Portugal feared that this was having a negative effect on Catholic proselytization since the slave trade in Japanese was growing to larger proportions, so he commanded that it be banned in 1571. However, the ban of preventing Portuguese merchants of buying Japanese slaves failed and the trade continued into the late 16th century.

Japanese slave women were sometimes sold as concubines to Asian lascar and African crew members, along with their European counterparts serving on Portuguese ships trading in Japan, mentioned by Luis Cerqueira, a Portuguese Jesuit, in a 1598 document. Japanese slaves were brought by the Portuguese to Macau, where some of them not only ended up being enslaved to Portuguese, but as slaves to other slaves, with the Portuguese owning Malay and African slaves, who in turn owned Japanese slaves of their own.

Hideyoshi was so disgusted that his own Japanese people were being sold en masse into slavery on Kyushu, that he wrote a letter to Jesuit Vice-Provincial Gaspar Coelho on 24 July 1587 to demand the Portuguese, Siamese (Thai), and Cambodians stop purchasing and enslaving Japanese and return Japanese slaves who ended up as far as India. Hideyoshi blamed the Portuguese and Jesuits for this slave trade and banned Christian proselytizing as a result.

Some Korean slaves were bought by the Portuguese and brought back to Portugal from Japan, where they had been among the tens of thousands of Korean prisoners of war transported to Japan during the Japanese invasions of Korea (1592–98). Although Hideyoshi expressed his indignation and outrage at the Portuguese trade in Japanese slaves, he himself was engaging in a mass slave trade of Korean prisoners of war in Japan.

Filippo Sassetti saw some Chinese and Japanese slaves in Lisbon among the large slave community in 1578, although most of the slaves were black.

The Portuguese "highly regarded" Asian slaves like Chinese and Japanese. The Portuguese attributed qualities like intelligence and industriousness to Chinese and Japanese slaves which is why they favoured them.

In 1595, a law was passed by Portugal banning the selling and buying of Chinese and Japanese slaves,  but forms of contract and indentured labor persisted alongside the period penal codes' forced labor. Somewhat later, the Edo period penal laws prescribed "non-free labor" for the immediate family of executed criminals in Article 17 of the Gotōke reijō (Tokugawa House Laws), but the practice never became common. The 1711 Gotōke reijō was compiled from over 600 statutes promulgated between 1597 and 1696.

Before World War II
Karayuki-san, literally meaning "Ms. In the 19th and early 20th centuries, there was a network of Japanese prostitutes being trafficked across Asia, in countries such as China, Vietnam, Korea, Singapore and India, in what was then known as the ’Yellow Slave Traffic’.

World War II

In the first half of the Shōwa era, as the Empire of Japan annexed Asian countries, from the late 19th century onwards, archaic institutions including slavery were abolished in those countries. However, during the Second Sino-Japanese War and the Pacific War, the Japanese military used millions of civilians and prisoners of war as forced labor, on projects such as the Burma Railway.

According to a joint study by historians including Zhifen Ju, Mitsuyoshi Himeta, Toru Kubo and Mark Peattie, more than 10 million Chinese civilians were mobilized by the Kōa-in (East Asia Development Board) for forced labour. According to the Japanese military's own record, nearly 25% of 140,000 Allied POWs died while interned in Japanese prison camps where they were forced to work (U.S. POWs died at a rate of 27%).  More than 100,000 civilians and POWs died in the construction of the Burma Railway. The U.S. Library of Congress estimates that in Java, between 4 and 10 million romusha (Japanese: "manual laborer"), were forced to work by the Japanese military. About 270,000 of these Javanese laborers were sent to the Outer Islands and other Japanese-held areas in South East Asia. Only 52,000 were repatriated to Java.

During World War II the Japanese empire used various types of foreign labor from its colonies, Korea and Taiwan. Japan mobilized its colonial labor within the same legal framework that was applied to the Japanese. There were different procedures for mobilizing labor. The method used first, in 1939 was the recruitment by private companies under government supervision. In 1942 it was introduced the official mediation method, where the government was more directly involved. The outright conscription was applied from 1944 to 1945.

According to the Korean historians, approximately 670,000 Koreans, were conscripted into labor from 1944 to 1945 by the National Mobilization Law. About 670,000 of them were taken to Japan, where about 60,000 died between 1939 and 1945 due mostly to exhaustion or poor working conditions. Many of those taken to Karafuto Prefecture (modern-day Sakhalin) were trapped there at the end of the war, stripped of their nationality and denied repatriation by Japan; they became known as the Sakhalin Koreans. The total deaths of Korean forced laborers in Korea and Manchuria for those years is estimated to be between 270,000 and 810,000.

Since the end of the Second World War, numerous people have filed lawsuits against the state and/or private companies in Japan, seeking compensation based on suffering as the result of forced labor. The plaintiffs had encountered many legal barriers to be awarded damages, including: sovereign immunity; statutes of limitations; and waiver of claims under the San Francisco Peace Treaty.

According to the United States House of Representatives House Resolution 121, as many as 200,000 "comfort women"  mostly from Korea and China, and some other countries and territories such as the Philippines, Taiwan, Burma, the Dutch East Indies, Netherlands, and Australia were forced into sexual slavery during World War II to satisfy Japanese Imperial Army and Navy members. Many of these women — particularly the Dutch and Australian women — were also used for hard physical labour, forced to work arduous tasks in the fields and roads such as digging graves, building roads and hoeing hard soil, in hellish heat while on starvation rations. While apologies have been handed out by the Japanese government and government politicians, including the Asian Women's fund, which grants donated financial compensations to former comfort women, the Japanese government has also worked to downplay its use of comfort women in recent times, claiming that all compensations for its war conduct were resolved with post-war treaties such as the Treaty of San Francisco, and, for example, asking the mayor of Palisades Park, New Jersey to take down a memorial in memory of the women.

See also 

Karayuki-san
History of slavery in Asia
Slavery in China
Slavery in Korea

References

Bibliography 

 

 
Social history of Japan
Military history of Japan during World War II
Second Sino-Japanese War
War crimes in Japan
Society of Japan